Alan Reed (1907–1977), was an actor.

Alan Reed may also refer to:

Alan Reed (RAAF officer); see List of Royal Australian Air Force air marshals
Alan Reed, musician in Pallas (band)

See also
Alan Reid (disambiguation)
Allan Reid (disambiguation)
Alan Read (disambiguation)
Allan Read, Bishop of Ontario